Lewis Bienek (born 11 April 1998) is an Ireland international rugby league footballer who plays as a  for the London Broncos in the RFL Championship.

He has previously played for the Broncos in the Betfred Championship, spending time on loan from London at Oxford in Kingstone Press League 1. Bienek played for Hull FC in the Super League, and spent time on loan from Hull at the London Broncos, Batley Bulldogs and the Leigh Centurions in the Championship and Doncaster in League 1. He has also played for the Castleford Tigers in the Betfred Super League.

Background
Bienek was born in Sidcup, London, England.

Playing career

London Broncos
Bienek started his professional career at the London Broncos, with a short loan period at Oxford.

Hull FC
Bienek has spent the majority of his time at Hull FC out on loan to the London Broncos, Doncaster, Batley & Leigh.

Castleford Tigers
In was announced on 24 November 2020 that Bienek had joined the Castleford Tigers (Heritage № 1006) on an initial one-year deal. He made his Castleford début, coming off the interchange bench, on 16 Apr 2021 (Round 3) in the 52-16 home victory over the Leigh Centurions.

London Broncos (re-join)
On 15 October 2021, it was reported that he had signed for the London Broncos in the RFL Championship

References

External links

Hull FC profile
London Broncos profile
SL profile

1998 births
Living people
Batley Bulldogs players
Castleford Tigers players
Doncaster R.L.F.C. players
English people of Polish descent
English rugby league players
Hull F.C. players
Ireland national rugby league team players
Leigh Leopards players
London Broncos players
Oxford Rugby League players
Rugby league players from Kent
Rugby league props